Azamora tortriciformis is a species of snout moth in the genus Azamora. It was described by Francis Walker in 1858, and is known from Brazil.

References

Chrysauginae
Moths described in 1858
Moths of South America